Halime Hatun was, according to some Ottoman folklore, the wife of Ertuğrul (13th century) and possibly the mother of Osman I.

Biography
Her origins are unknown; she is variously referred to as "Hayme Ana" in later legends, and is not mentioned at all in any historical Ottoman texts. Hayme Ana is also a traditional name of Ertuğrul's mother.

Historian Heath W. Lowry, among other Ottoman scholars, states that Osman I's mother is unknown. The burial place of Halime Hatun, which was added in the late 19th century by Sultan Abdul Hamid II, is located in the garden of the Ertuğrul Gazi's grave in Söğüt, present-day Turkey. According to historian Cemal Kafadar, the 19th century "recovery" and "rebuilding" of this tomb by the Sultan, with the name added later, was politically motivated. Additionally, according to author Turgut Güler, "Hayme Ana", buried in Domanic, was most likely the wife of Ertuğrul.

Gevaş tomb

A türbe (tomb) was built for a Halime Hatun in Gevaş in 1358. This Halime is said to have been the daughter of a Seljuk ruler, Melik Izeddin, and perhaps a member of the Karakoyunlu dynasty.

In popular culture

Esra Bilgiç appeared as Halime Hatun in the Turkish TV series Diriliş: Ertuğrul. In this story, she is a Seljuk princess.

See also
Ottoman dynasty
Ottoman family tree
List of mothers of Ottoman sultans

References

13th-century women
Mothers of Ottoman sultans